First-class cricket matches are those between international teams or the highest standard of domestic teams in which teams have two innings each. Generally, matches are eleven players a side but there have been exceptions. Today, all matches must be scheduled to have at least three days' duration. The Ireland cricket team first played first-class cricket in 1902 against W. G. Grace's London County. From 1902, Ireland played 159 first-class matches prior to their elevation to Test status in June 2017. The majority of these matches were the annual Ireland v Scotland fixture, but others saw touring teams visiting Ireland during tours of England to play one first-class match against Ireland, normally a College Park, Dublin. Occasionally teams based in Ireland (or touring abroad) were afforded first-class status. These include Dublin University, the Gentlemen of Ireland, and Woodbrook Club and Ground, which all heavily featured Irish cricketers. Following the Irish War of Independence and the ban by the Gaelic Athletic Association in 1901 on playing "foreign", in practice, British, games, cricket went into decline across Ireland. However, it was able to survive in its Dublin, Belfast and North-West heartlands. The ban on playing "foreign" games was lifted in 1970, and cricket began to recover. Owing to Ireland's non-membership, and later associate membership of the International Cricket Council, many of the top Irish cricketers sought first-class experience in English county cricket, including some, such as Sir Tim O'Brien and Eoin Morgan playing Test cricket for England. The annual Ireland v Scotland fixture came to an end in 2000, with Ireland playing in the ICC Intercontinental Cup from 2004 to 2017, winning the competition on four occasions. With Test status granted to Ireland in 2017, for the first time matches in Inter-Provincial Championship had first-class status.

Prior to this, 391 Irishman had played first-class cricket from 1790–2017. Tim O'Brien has made more appearances in first-class cricket than any other Irishman, with 266. Ed Joyce has scored more runs at first-class level than any other Irishman, scoring 18,461 runs in a first-class career that lasted from 1997 to 2018, he also has the highest score by an Irishman with 255. The highest batting average by an Irishman who has played over twenty matches belongs to Andrew White, who averaged 48.42 from 34 matches. Tim Murtagh has taken more wickets at first-class level than any other Irishman, with 760. James Boucher has the best bowling average for players who have taken over fifty wickets, his 168 wickets coming at an average of 14.04 apiece. Francis Fee has the best bowling figures in an innings by an Irishman, with 9/26. Niall O'Brien has the most wicket-keeping dismissals among Irishmen, with 492 catches and 48 stumpings.

This list contains only Irish born players, or those who have emigrated to Ireland and qualified to play for Ireland as Irish citizens. The list covers the years 1790 to March 2017, just prior to Ireland's Inter-Provincial Championship gaining first-class status. For Irish cricketers who made their debut in first-class cricket after March 2017, see: List of Leinster Lightning first-class players, List of Northern Knights first-class players, List of North West Warriors first-class players.

Key

List of first-class cricketers

See also
List of Ireland Test cricketers
List of Ireland ODI cricketers
List of Ireland Twenty20 International cricketers
:Category:Ireland cricketers - contains non-Irish cricketers who played as overseas players for Ireland

References

First class
Irish